Vadym Vyacheslavovych Vitenchuk (born 13 January 1997) is a Ukrainian professional footballer who plays as a defensive midfielder for Ukrainian club Mynai.

References

External links
 
 

1997 births
Living people
Place of birth missing (living people)
Ukrainian footballers
Association football midfielders
FC Zorya Luhansk players
FC Oleksandriya players
MFC Mykolaiv players
MFC Mykolaiv-2 players
FC Kramatorsk players
FC Mynai players
Ukrainian Premier League players
Ukrainian First League players
Ukrainian Second League players